Aminata Fatou Diallo (born 3 April 1995) is a French former footballer who played as a midfielder.

Club career

Paris Saint Germain, 2016–2022
Diallo signed a two-season contract with Paris Saint-Germain Féminines in June 2016.

Utah Royals (2020, loan) 
On 11 March 2020, Diallo joined Utah Royals on loan for the 2020 NWSL season.

Atlético de Madrid Femenino (2021, loan) 
On 2 January 2021, Diallo joined Atlético de Madrid Femenino on loan. She made no appearances for the club.

She returned to Paris Saint-Germain in the summer of 2021. The club did not extend her contract when it expired at the end of the 2021–22 season, and she retired from the sport.

Personal life
Diallo is of Senegalese descent.

In November 2021, Diallo's Paris Saint-Germain teammate Kheira Hamraoui was assaulted in the street after two masked men dragged her from a club-issued car driven by Diallo, who was pinned down but not seriously injured herself. On 10 November 2021, Diallo was arrested on suspicion of arranging the attack. After 36 hours, Diallo was released from police custody without any charges being filed against her. After further investigation she was re-arrested in September 2022 on charges of serious bodily harm. Placed under judicial supervision and forbidden from entering Paris or contacting her former team as the investigation was conducted, Diallo contested her innocence to the press in October 2022, saying that she did not know the four men (charged with conducting the attack) who alleged she hired them.

Career statistics

International

Scores and results list France's goal tally first, score column indicates score after each Diallo goal.

Honours
Paris Saint-Germain
 Coupe de France féminine: 2017–18, 2021–22
 UEFA Women's Champions League: runner-up 2016–17

France U19
 UEFA Women's Under-19 Championship: 2013

References

External links
 
 
 
 
 Paris Saint-Germain player profile 

1995 births
Living people
Sportspeople from Grenoble
French women's footballers
France women's youth international footballers
Women's association football midfielders
En Avant Guingamp (women) players
Paris Saint-Germain Féminine players
Utah Royals FC players
Atlético Madrid Femenino players
Division 1 Féminine players
National Women's Soccer League players
France women's international footballers
French sportspeople of Senegalese descent
Black French sportspeople
French expatriate women's footballers
French expatriate sportspeople in the United States
Expatriate women's soccer players in the United States
French expatriate sportspeople in Spain
Expatriate women's footballers in Spain
Footballers from Auvergne-Rhône-Alpes